Ceryx claremontii is a moth of the family Erebidae (subfamily Arctiinae). It was described by Franciscus J. M. Heylaerts in 1890. It is found on Sumatra and Java.

References

Ceryx (moth)
Moths described in 1890